The Billboard Music Award for Top Selling Album was first presented in 2018.

Winners and nominees

References

Billboard awards
Album awards